Justice Weaver or Judge Weaver or variation, may refer to:

Elizabeth Weaver, associate justice of the Michigan Supreme Court
Frank P. Weaver, associate justice of the Washington Supreme Court
Silas M. Weaver, associate justice of the Iowa Supreme Court

See also
 Weaver (surname)
 Weaver (disambiguation)